Matovu is a surname. Notable people with the surname include:

Jackson Matovu, Anglican bishop in Uganda
Moses Matovu (born 1949), Ugandan musician and saxophonist
Samalie Matovu, Ugandan singer
Sula Matovu (born 1986), Ugandan soccer player

Bantu-language surnames